Tirunavalur may refer to:

 Tirunavalur block
 Tirunavalur (state assembly constituency)